Livermere is part of the name of two places in Suffolk, England:

Great Livermere
Little Livermere

See also
Livermore